is the 3rd major single by the Japanese girl idol group S/mileage. It was released in Japan on September 29, 2010 on the label Hachama.

The physical CD single debuted at number 4 in the Oricon daily singles chart.

In the Oricon weekly chart, it debuted at number 5.

B-sides 
The B-side of the regular edition was a cover of the song "Chocotto Love" by a Morning Musume subgroup called Petit Moni that released it as a single in 1999.

Release 
The single was released in four versions: three limited editions (Limited Editions A, B, and C) and a regular edition.

All the limited editions and the first press of the regular edition came with a sealed-in serial-numbered entry card for the lottery to win a ticket to one of the single's launch events.

The corresponding DVD single (so called Single V) was released one week later, on October 6, 2010.

Personnel 
S/mileage members: 
 Ayaka Wada
 Yūka Maeda
 Kanon Fukuda
 Saki Ogawa

Track listing

Regular Edition

Charts

References

External links 
 Profile of the CD single on the official website of Hello! Project
 Profile of the DVD single (Single V) on the official website of Hello! Project

2010 singles
Japanese-language songs
Angerme songs
Songs written by Tsunku
Song recordings produced by Tsunku
2010 songs